This portion of National Register of Historic Places listings in Puerto Rico is along the central mountain region, from Las Marías and Maricao in the central-west to Juncos in the central-east, including the slopes of the Cordillera.

Names of places given are as appear in the National Register, reflecting name as given in NRHP application at the date of listing. Note, the National Register name system does not accommodate Spanish á, ñ and other letters.

Adjuntas

|}

Aguas Buenas 

|}

Aibonito 

|}

Barranquitas 

|}

Caguas 

|}

Cayey 

|}

Ciales 

|}

Cidra 

|}

Coamo

|}

Comerío 

|}

Corozal 

|}

Gurabo 

|}

Jayuya

|}

Juncos 

|}

Lares 

|}

Las Marías 

|}

Maricao 

|}

Morovis 

|}

Naranjito 

|}

Orocovis 

|}

San Lorenzo 

|}

Trujillo Alto 

|}

Utuado 

|}

Villalba

|}

See also

 National Register of Historic Places listings in Puerto Rico
 National Register of Historic Places listings in eastern Puerto Rico
 National Register of Historic Places listings in southern Puerto Rico
 National Register of Historic Places listings in northern Puerto Rico
 National Register of Historic Places listings in western Puerto Rico
 National Register of Historic Places listings in San Juan, Puerto Rico
 List of United States National Historic Landmarks in United States commonwealths and territories, associated states, and foreign states
 Historic preservation
 History of Puerto Rico

Notes

References

External links

 Puerto Rico State Historic Preservation Office, National Register of Historic Places site
 National Park Service, National Register of Historic Places site

Central